The Highflyer-class corvettes were a pair of 21-gun wooden screw corvettes built in the 1850s for the Royal Navy.

Design
Highflyer was ordered as a small wooden frigate to a design by the Surveyor's Department of the Admiralty on 25 April 1847; she and her sister Esk were re-designated as corvettes in 1854.  These ships were envisaged as steam auxiliaries, intended to cruise under sail with the steam engine available for assistance.  Commensurately they were provided with a full square sailing rig. Esk was built in exchange for HMS Greenock (which went to the Australian Royal Mail Co.) The words of the Admiralty Order stated she should be "a wood screw vessel complete of Highflyers [class] in exchange when built".

Propulsion
Highflyer was given a geared two-cylinder horizontal single-expansion steam engine, provided by Maudslay, Sons & Field, which developed  and drove a single screw.  Esk was provided with an oscillating two-cylinder inclined single-expansion steam engine, provided by the builders, was quite different from Highflyers, but developed broadly the same power —  — and drove a single screw.

Armament
The class was a 21-gun corvette, mounting twenty 32-pounder (42cwt) long guns in a broadside arrangement, and a single 10-inch 84-pounder (85cwt) gun on a pivot. Both ships later swapped their broadside 32-pounders for eighteen 8-inch guns.

Construction
Highflyer was built at Leamouth Wharf by C J Mare & Co., while Esk was ordered from the Millwall yard of J. Scott Russell & Co. on the River Thames.

Ships

References

Corvettes of the Royal Navy
Victorian-era corvettes of the United Kingdom